Paleface may refer to:

 The Paleface (1922 film), starring Buster Keaton
 The Paleface (1948 film), starring Bob Hope
 Paleface (Finnish musician) (born 1978), Finnish hip hop musician
 Paleface (musician), American singer, songwriter, musician, and artist
 Paleface attack, a popular chess opening
 Paleface River, Saint Louis County, Minnesota, United States
 Hibiscus denudatus, a plant known by the common name "paleface"

See also